"Who Was in My Room Last Night?" is the opening track from American rock band Butthole Surfers' sixth album, Independent Worm Saloon. A remixed version, known as the "Tate or Tot Mix" was released on the CD magazine Volume Eight.

Music video
The music video was directed by William Stobaugh, and animated by Tom Holleran and Wes Archer. The video depicts a man who drives to a bar where the Butthole Surfers are performing the song. He orders a drink from the bartender (played by Flea of the Red Hot Chili Peppers) and, upon consuming it, experiences some bizarre hallucinations (mostly involving the bar's waitress (played by Therese Kablan) who is depicted as the man's girlfriend, a nurse, and a series of creatures) before he suffers an apparent accident and is last seen falling down a void of cartoon skulls.

The video was shown in the Beavis and Butt-head episode "No Laughing".

In other media
A cover version of this song was featured on the 2006 video game Guitar Hero II.

A censored version of the song was used in a commercial for Nintendo's Play It Loud! campaign.

References

1993 singles
Butthole Surfers songs
1993 songs